La Grande Écurie et la Chambre du Roy is a French musical ensemble, based in Tourcoing, France, that performs using period instruments. The group was founded in 1966 by Jean-Claude Malgoire and led by him until his death in April of 2018. Alexis Kossenko, flutist and conductor, was named music director of the group in October 2019 While the ensemble has performed a wide repertoire from a variety of musical periods, the group has drawn particular acclaim for their performances of baroque music and the works of Wolfgang Amadeus Mozart. The group has toured 5 continents and has made more than 100 recordings. The ensemble's recording of Antonio Vivaldi's Motezuma was awarded the Victoires de la musique classique in 1992. Their recording of Vivaldi's Vêpres pour la Nativité de la Vierge won the Grand Prix du Disque. The ensemble is supported financially by the France's Ministry of Culture and the city of Tourcoing.

Discography
 Live video recording - 2004 - Claudio Monteverdi - L'Orfeo - Théâtre Municipal de Tourcoing - Jean-Claude Malgoire (Conductor) Cast: Kobie van Rensburg, Cyrille Gerstenhaber, Philippe Jaroussky, Bernard Deletré - Dynamic Cat. 33477, DVD

References

Baroque music groups
French instrumental groups
Musical groups established in 1966
1966 establishments in France